Grumbach is a municipality in Rhineland-Palatinate, Germany.

Grumbach may also refer to:

 Grumbach, Bad Langensalza, a village in Thuringia, Germany
 Grumbach (surname)
 Grumbach (Innerste), a river of Lower Saxony, Germany, tributary of the Innerste
 Grumbach (Werra), a river of Thuringia, Germany, tributary of the Werra

See also
 Grumbacher, an American manufacturer of art materials